The Slovenia men's national field hockey team represent Slovenia in men's international field hockey competitions and is controlled by the Slovenian Hockey Federation, the governing body for field hockey in Slovenia.

The team competes in the EuroHockey Championship IV, the fourth level of the men's European field hockey championships.

Tournament record

EuroHockey Championship III
2009 – 6th place

EuroHockey Championship IV
2007 – 
2017 – 
2019 – 5th place
2021 – Withdrew

See also
Slovenia women's national field hockey team
Yugoslavia men's national field hockey team

References

European men's national field hockey teams
National team
Field hockey